General elections were held in Saint Lucia on 26 July 2021, having been constitutionally required by 12 October 2021. Voters elected all 17 members of the House of Assembly. The result was a victory for the opposition Saint Lucia Labour Party, which won 13 of the 17 seats in the House, while the ruling United Workers Party lost nine of its eleven seats, its worst result since 1997. It was the fourth consecutive election in which the incumbent government was defeated.

Electoral system
The 17 elected members of the House of Assembly were elected by first-past-the-post in single member constituencies.  

According to the constitution, elections for a new Parliament session can be held at the latest 5 years and 90 days after the opening of the previous session.  The first session after the 2016 election was held on 12 July 2016, leaving the deadline in October 2021.  Incumbent Prime Minister Allen Chastanet favoured a later date, stating in April 2021 his intent to avoid another outbreak of the COVID-19 pandemic in Saint Lucia.  On 5 July 2021, he announced that the election would be held on 26 July.

Campaign
Political parties began announcing prospective candidates in December 2020.

On Nomination Day, 16 July, the governing United Workers Party (UWP) nominated candidates for all 17 constituencies.  The opposition Saint Lucia Labour Party (SLP) nominated candidates for 15 constituencies, not fielding candidates in two constituencies where former UWP members campaigned as independents. The National Green Party (NGP) nominated candidates for eight constituencies. 

Although the parties held campaign rallies, they mutually agreed not to allow motorcades after warnings from health authorities.

In June 2021 the UWP announced a five-point pledge of top priority items it would deliver if re-elected: the pledge included additional support for needy persons, a reduction in VAT, electronic textbooks for students and a health insurance programme covering all citizens.

The NGP was founded on 23 May 2021. For the upcoming election, the party announced food security to be its key issue, along with constitutional reforms that the UWP and SLP had not passed.  The NGP also proposed increased spending on social services and tourism infrastructure; these projects would be funded by establishing a legal cannabis industry.

Conduct
The Caribbean Community sent a team of ten election observers for the main election as well as the advance polls on 23 July, and gave a favourable initial assessment. Chaired by Alvin Smith, the five-member team from the Commonwealth also praised the conduct of the elections, but criticised the slow updating of the voter registry.  The Organization of American States sent a team of twelve election observers.

Results
The SLP flipped seven seats, winning 13 of the 17 in the House. For the first time since independence, the UWP lost the Micoud North seat. The UWP retained only two seats, those of PM Chastenet and Commerce Minister Bradley Felix, while the two former UWP members running as independents, Stephenson King and Richard Frederick, won their seats.

By constituency

Reactions

Domestic
SLP leader Pierre thanked the people of Saint Lucia for his party's win, promising to focus on healthcare and youth employment.  PM Chastanet called Pierre to offer his congratulations.  In a Facebook post, Chastanet thanked the UWP supporters and announced that the party will regroup.  The NGP Deputy Leader Aaron Alexander congratulated the SLP and affirmed his party's willingness to work with them to improve the country.

International
 Grenada: Prime Minister Keith Mitchell and the opposition National Democratic Congress party both issued statements congratulating the SLP.
 Dominica: Prime Minister Roosevelt Skerrit, leader of the Dominica Labour Party, congratulated Pierre and SLP in a radio interview: "Anytime there is a difficulty in a country, people feel more comfortable with the Labour Party in office."
 Antigua and Barbuda: Prime Minister Gaston Browne sent a letter of congratulations to Pierre.

Aftermath
SLP leader Philip J. Pierre was sworn in as the new Prime Minister on 28 July.  The new Cabinet was sworn in on 5 August in a ceremony attended by Antiguan PM Gaston Browne.  It consisted of 13 ministers, including the two independent MPs, and two parliamentary secretaries.

Cabinet of Ministers

Parliamentary Secretaries

References 

Saint Lucia
General election
Elections in Saint Lucia
Saint Lucia